The term réseau derives from a French word meaning "network". It may mean:

a network of fine lines on a glass plate, used in photographic telescopes to make a corresponding network on photographs of the stars: see Réseau plate
a system of weather stations under a single agency, or cooperating on common goals
an intelligence network as used by John Le Carré, in Tinker, Tailor, Soldier, Spy, chapter 11. 
the net in bobbin lace
 SNCF TGV Réseau